Mikko Olavi Nousiainen (born 26 April 1975, in Tampere) is a Finnish actor. His father is actor Heikki Nousiainen.

Selected filmography
 Friends, Comrades (1990)
Going to Kansas City (1998)
Restless (2000)
Stripping (2002)
Kohtalon kirja (2002)
Sibelius (2003)
Trench Road (2004)
5 Days of War (2011)
The Kiss of Evil (2011)
Rakkauden rasvaprosentti (2012)
Vuonna 85 (2013)
 The Liberation of Skopje (2016)

References

External links

1975 births
Living people
Male actors from Tampere
Finnish male film actors